Mordellistena antennalis is a beetle in the genus Mordellistena of the family Mordellidae. It was described in 1990 by Batten.

References

antennalis
Beetles described in 1990